Natalie Hoover is an American voice actress based in Los Angeles and Dallas. She has done voicework for anime, video games, and other audio productions.

Career 
In 2010, Hoover was deemed as the Japanator New York Anime Festival and Comic Con voice acting contest winner. In 2012, she was chosen to voice Lady S in the short film Kick-Heart by the creator and director of the film Masaaki Yuasa himself.

In anime, Hoover is known as the voice of Nana Sakurai from Prince of Stride: Alternative, Jintsū from Kancolle Tomoyo in Cardcaptor Sakura: Clear Card, and Georgette Lemare from Brave Witches. In video games, she is known for her performances as Sonia Nevermind from Danganronpa 2, Ryubence from The Witch and the Hundred Knight, Tiara from Fairy Fencer F, Adelheid from Lord of Magna: Maiden Heaven, Monophanie from Danganronpa V3: Killing Harmony, and Ayn Felice from Tales of Zestiria and its anime adaptation.

In her spare time, she releases her covers of various anison songs on SoundCloud.

Filmography

Anime

Film

Video games

References

Citations

External links 
 
 
 
 

Living people
American video game actresses
American voice actresses
Year of birth missing (living people)
21st-century American women